The Ministry of Agriculture is a ministry of the Croatian government, whose work is aimed at overseeing the development of agriculture and fisheries in Croatia. The current Agriculture Minister is Marija Vučković, member of the Croatian Democratic Union.

List of ministers

Notes
 nb 1.   Served as Minister of Agriculture, Forestry and Waterworks
nb 2.  Served as Minister of Agriculture, Forestry
nb 3.  Served as Minister of Agriculture, Fisheries and Rural Development

See also 
 Economy of Croatia
 Croatian cuisine

References

External links
 

Agriculture
Croatia
Agricultural organizations based in Croatia
Croatia
1990 establishments in Croatia